This list gives the number of distinct land borders of each country or territory, as well as the neighboring countries and territories. The length of each border is included, as is the total length of each country's or territory's borders.

Countries or territories that are connected only by man-made structures such as bridges, causeways or tunnels are not considered to have land borders. However, borders along lakes, rivers, and other internal waters are considered land borders for the purposes of this article.

Land borders

Superlatives
 Longest land border: : 
 Longest land border between two countries:
  – :  (Canada–United States border)
  – :  (Kazakhstan–Russia border)
  – : 5,308 km (3,298 mi) (Argentina–Chile border)
  - : 4,677 km (2,906 mi) (China–Mongolia border)
  - :  (Bangladesh–India border)
  - :  (China–Russia border)
  - :  (Mongolia–Russia border)
  - :  (Bolivia–Brazil border)
  -  :  (Line of Actual Control)
  - :  (Mexico–United States border)
 Longest single segments of land borders:
  – : 
  – : 
  – : 
 Shortest land borders between two countries:
  – :  near Kazungula
  (Gibraltar) – : 
  (Greenland) – :  at Hans Island 
  – : 
  – : 
  – : 
 Shortest single segments of land border:
  – :  at Peñón de Vélez de la Gomera
  – :  at K Island
  – :  at what was previously thought to be the Kazungula quadripoint
  – :  at Baarle-Nassau / Baarle-Hertog
  – :  at Baarle-Nassau / Baarle-Hertog
  – :  at Baarle-Nassau / Baarle-Hertog
  (Åland) – :  at Kataja
 Most separate segments of land borders between any two countries or territories: 
  – : 31
  – : 6
  – : 6
  – : 6
  –  (UK): 6
  – : 4
 Highest number of bordering countries:

See also 
 How Long Is the Coast of Britain? Statistical Self-Similarity and Fractional Dimension
 Island country
 Landlocked country
 List of countries and territories by land and maritime borders
 List of countries and territories by maritime boundaries
 List of countries that border only one other country
 List of land borders with dates of establishment
 List of divided islands
 List of island countries
 List of political and geographic borders
 List of bordering countries with greatest relative differences in GDP (PPP) per capita
 Separation barrier

Notes

References

 

Borders, land
Countries and territories by land borders
Land borders
Land
Countries and territories by land borders